Thomas Martin "Tad" Boyle (born January 6, 1963) is an American college basketball coach who is the men's head coach of the Colorado Buffaloes of the Pac-12 Conference. He was named the 18th coach in Colorado men's basketball history on April 19, 2010, replacing Jeff Bzdelik. Boyle was named as an assistant coach for USA Basketball a second time in 2015. He played collegiately at Kansas under coach Ted Owens and Hall of Fame coach Larry Brown.

While playing for the Jayhawks, Boyle played on two NCAA tournament teams in 1984 and 1985. He served as team captain his senior year, which was 1988 NBA draft choice Danny Manning's freshman season and Mark Turgeon's sophomore season.

Before heading to play collegiately at Kansas, Boyle was a standout performer at Greeley Central High School, where he led the Wildcats to a state championship as a senior in 1981 and earned Colorado Player of the Year honors, as well as being selected to the Converse All-American team. His high school jersey was retired at the conclusion of his senior season.

Playing career
Boyle played collegiately for legendary coach Larry Brown at Kansas (1981–85). He was a member of two NCAA Tournament teams (1984, 1985) and was part of the 1984 Big Eight tournament championship squad. As a senior, Boyle captained the Jayhawks, which featured freshman Danny Manning, who three years later led the Jayhawks to the NCAA Championship.

Coaching career

Early days
After earning a bachelor of science degree in business administration from Kansas in 1985, he became a commodities broker in Kansas City. In 1986 he returned to Colorado and continued his career as a commodities broker; he also got back into basketball and went on to serve for six years as a high school basketball coach at various Colorado programs. He was the sophomore basketball coach at Greeley West High School for a year and then was an assistant coach at Loveland High School for two years. From there, he served at Longmont High School for three years.

A car accident in 1994 changed Boyle's career forever. Boyle was heading to work one morning when somebody ran a red light and plowed into his vehicle at the intersection of McCaslin Boulevard and South Boulder Road in Louisville, Colorado. The collision crushed the front of Boyle's car. He was knocked unconscious, but the air bag likely saved his life. At that point, Boyle was earning six figures as a stockbroker and considered his "other" job, as head coach at Longmont High, to be little more than a hobby. Later that year, Boyle received a phone call from his former University of Kansas teammate, Mark Turgeon, then an assistant at Oregon. Turgeon stated that there was an opening on Oregon's staff, but it was a restricted earnings position that paid $16,000 a year. Boyle, not married at the time, decided to take the plunge into a full-time coaching gig.

Other jobs
After his first year at CU, Boyle received interest for the head coaching position at Texas A&M vacated by his old friend Mark Turgeon, after Turgeon left to be the head coach at Maryland. Boyle rebuffed this interest and stayed at his "dream job" at CU.

Following his second season at CU, Boyle continued to draw interest from other programs, and his name was linked with the Nebraska and Kansas State openings, although he once again denied interest in both jobs, stating "I want to do something special here at Colorado. I don’t have any interest in other jobs. I would love it if CU were my last job."

Fan following
Under Boyle's leadership, there have been several sell-outs for CU games at Coors Event Center and increased season ticket sales.  Several thousand fans also made the trip to Albuquerque for CU-UNLV and CU-Baylor NCAA tournament games.  Colorado Athletic Director Mike Bohn responded to increased student interest by flying 50 students, all expenses paid, to Los Angeles for the Pac-12 tournament and taking 100 students to the NCAA tournament games in Albuquerque.
After the success of the C-Unit OG 50, Colorado Athletic Director Mike Bohn repeated the trip the following year by taking another group of 50 students on an all-expense-paid trip to Las Vegas for the 2013 Pac-12 tournament. However, the Buffaloes were unable to repeat as champions as they lost in the second round to the eventual runner-up Arizona Wildcats.

Personal life
Boyle is married to the former Ann Schell of Greeley, and they have two sons, Jack and Pete, and a daughter, Claire.

Head coaching record

References

External links
 Colorado profile
 Wichita State profile
 Jacksonville State profile

1963 births
Living people
American men's basketball coaches
American men's basketball players
Basketball coaches from Colorado
Basketball players from Colorado
College men's basketball head coaches in the United States
Colorado Buffaloes men's basketball coaches
High school basketball coaches in Colorado
Jacksonville State Gamecocks men's basketball coaches
Kansas Jayhawks men's basketball players
Northern Colorado Bears men's basketball coaches
Oregon Ducks men's basketball coaches
People from Greeley, Colorado
Tennessee Volunteers basketball coaches
Wichita State Shockers men's basketball coaches